Thomas Joseph Tauke (born October 11, 1950) is an American politician, lawyer, and corporate executive from Iowa. He is a former member of the U.S. House of Representatives, serving eight terms from 1975 to 1991.

Biography   
Tauke's undergraduate degree was earned at Loras College in Dubuque, Iowa, and his Juris Doctor degree was earned at the University of Iowa College of Law in 1974.

Prior to entering the House, he had served as a lawyer.  He was also a two-term member of the Iowa House of Representatives from 1975 to 1979.

Congress 
Tauke represented the northeast corner of the state of Iowa (2nd district) as a Republican from 1979 to 1991, entering Congress as one of the youngest members. Tauke left active politics in 1991 following an unsuccessful bid to unseat U.S. Senator Tom Harkin.  Jim Nussle succeeded him as the representative for northeast Iowa.

Later career 
From 1991 to 2013 he served as executive vice president for public affairs, policy and communications of Verizon.  He has made recent news with his statements in opposition to the Net Neutrality Bill, which has been a recent source of debate among internet users.  As a spokesman for Verizon, one of the main opponents of the bill, Tauke has expressed his discontent with Net Neutrality.

Retirement 
Since retiring from Verizon he has served on many boards and committees (both non-profit and for-profit) and is past chair of the board of regents of Loras College and the Washington Center.

He currently resides in Alexandria, Virginia, with his wife Beverly and children Joseph and Elizabeth. He serves on the board of directors of the Committee for a Responsible Federal Budget.

References

External links

 

1950 births
Living people
Iowa lawyers
Republican Party members of the Iowa House of Representatives
Loras College alumni
University of Iowa College of Law alumni
Politicians from Dubuque, Iowa
Spokespersons
Politicians from Alexandria, Virginia
Republican Party members of the United States House of Representatives from Iowa
Members of Congress who became lobbyists